Until We Die is the second studio album by A Global Threat. It was originally released in summer 2000 on GMM Records. The original cd only pressing is out of print and difficult to find. It features cover art by bass guitarist Gabe Crate. The album was re-mastered and issued in 2012 on vinyl and cd format by Jailhouse Records.

Track listing

Lineup for recording 
 Bryan – vocals
 Mark – vocals
 Pete – guitar
 Gabe – bass guitar
 Mike – drums

Engineered by Dave Tarbox

A Global Threat albums
2000 albums